The SJPF Young Player of the Month (often called Portuguese League Young Player of the Month) is an association football award that recognizes the best Portuguese League young player each month of the season and is conceived by the SJPF (syndicate of professional football players). The award has been presented since the 2003–04 season and the recipient is based on individual scores assigned by the three national sports dailies (A Bola, Record and O Jogo). The first winner of the award was João Moutinho in October 2006. Moutinho has won the award a record six times. Only Portuguese players under age 23 are in contention to win the award.

Prior to the 2012–13 Primeira Liga season, the SJPF announced that the SJPF Primeira Liga Young Player of the Month award would be awarded to a player on a bimonthly status with one player receiving an award for two months of football that have been played. The awards would be awarded during the following periods:
 August and September (Awarded to the Player of the Month in relation to football being played between Gameweek 1 to Gameweek 5)
 October and November (Awarded to the Player of the Month in relation to football being played between Gameweek 6 to Gameweek 10)
 December and January (Awarded to the Player of the Month in relation to football being played between Gameweek 11 to Gameweek 16)
 February (Awarded to the Player of the Month in relation to football being played between Gameweek 17 to Gameweek 20)
 March (Awarded to the Player of the Month in relation to football being played between Gameweek 21 to Gameweek 24)
 April (Awarded to the Player of the Month in relation to football being played between Gameweek 25 to Gameweek 27)

Winners

Key

Statistics

Awards won by club

Multiple winners

Awards won by position

Footnotes

References

 
Portuguese football trophies and awards
Association football player non-biographical articles